A Practical Guide for Policy Analysis: The Eightfold Path to More Effective Problem Solving is a nonfiction book of policy analysis assembled by Eugene Bardach, a professor at the Goldman School of Public Policy at the University of California, Berkeley.  This book is commonly referenced in public policy and public administration scholarship.

See also 
 Noble Eightfold Path

References

External links 
 WorldCat Library Catalog: A Practical Guide for Policy Analysis

1996 non-fiction books
Political books